Thomas R. Kerr (April 24, 1843 – November 14, 1926) was a soldier in the Union Army in the American Civil War. Kerr received his country's highest award for bravery during combat, the Medal of Honor. Kerr's medal was won for his capturing the flag of the Confederate 8th Virginia Cavalry Regiment at Moorefield in West Virginia on August 7, 1864. He was honored with the award on June 13, 1894.

Medal of Honor citation

Background
Kerr was born in Coleraine, County Londonderry, Ireland. He was commissioned as a second lieutenant with the 14th Pennsylvania Cavalry in November 1862. He was promoted to captain in May 1864 and resigned in June 1865. Kerr is buried at Arlington National Cemetery, in Arlington, Virginia.

Battle
Kerr earned his medal in the Battle of Moorefield on August 7, 1864. The battle occurred in a portion of West Virginia that was hostile to the Union during the American Civil War. Kerr led a group of 60 men into a Confederate camp early in the morning. Two Union brigades under the command of Brigadier General William W. Averell followed, and the Union force surprised and routed a larger Confederate cavalry force that had burned the Pennsylvania town of Chambersburg only a few days earlier. Kerr was shot in the face and thigh, and his horse killed—yet he captured the flag of the 8th Virginia Cavalry Regiment and rode away on the color bearer's horse. Averell's small division captured 27 officers and 393 enlisted men, 4 artillery pieces, and 400 horses. The Confederate killed and wounded was unknown. Union losses were 7 killed and 21 wounded. A Union soldier that fought in the battle estimated that the "loss to the enemy in killed, wounded and captured was near eight hundred". The loss severely damaged Confederate cavalry in the Shenandoah Valley.

See also
 List of American Civil War Medal of Honor recipients: G–L

Notes

Footnotes

Citations

References

External links
 

1843 births
1926 deaths
American Civil War recipients of the Medal of Honor
Burials at Arlington National Cemetery
Irish-born Medal of Honor recipients
Irish emigrants to the United States (before 1923)
People of Pennsylvania in the American Civil War
People from Coleraine, County Londonderry
Military personnel from Pittsburgh
Union Army officers
United States Army Medal of Honor recipients